Philip Speakman Webb (12 January 1831 – 17 April 1915) was a British architect and designer sometimes called the Father of Arts and Crafts Architecture. His use of vernacular architecture demonstrated his commitment to "the art of common building." William Morris, Edward Burne-Jones and Dante Gabriel Rossetti were his business partners and her designed many notable buildings including one for Morris. He co-founded the Society for the Protection of Ancient Buildings.

Biography

Born in Oxford, Webb studied at Aynho in Northamptonshire and was then articled to firms of builder-architects in Wolverhampton and Reading, Berkshire. He then moved to London where he eventually became a junior assistant to the architect George Edmund Street. While there he met William Morris in 1856 and then started his own practice in 1858.
He is particularly noted as the designer of the Red House at Bexleyheath, south-east London in 1859 for William Morris, and – towards the end of his career – the house Standen (near East Grinstead in West Sussex). These were among several works in his favoured niche: country houses. A Greater London Council blue plaque commemorates both Webb and Morris at the Red House.

William Morris, Edward Burne-Jones and Dante Gabriel Rossetti were three of his partners in the interior decorating and furnishing business, Morris, Marshall, Faulkner & Co., later to become Morris & Co.

Webb and Morris formed an important part of the Arts and Crafts movement, and founded the Society for the Protection of Ancient Buildings in 1877. With Morris, Webb wrote the SPAB Manifesto, one of the key documents in the history of building conservation. He attended over 700 SPAB Committee meetings as well as undertaking numerous site visits. Webb also joined Morris's revolutionary Socialist League, becoming its treasurer.

George Howard of Naworth Castle near Brampton in Cumbria was an able artist and friend of the Pre-Raphaelites, and a keen patron of Philip Webb. Webb had built two houses for his Naworth Castle Estate: Four Gables and Green Lane House, as well as his London house at 1 Palace Green. Much financial help was offered by Charles Howard MP (George Howard's father) towards building a new church in Brampton on condition that he chose the architect. Webb's plan for St Martin's Church is quite unlike most other Victorian churches, with the body of the church being almost square. It is the only church designed by Webb, and contains an exquisite set of stained glass windows designed by Burne-Jones, and executed in the William Morris studio.

His friendship with the family of Sir Thomas Hugh Bell, a leading ironfounder of Middlesbrough, led to three commissions: Rounton Grange (demolished in 1953), Red Barns House in 1868, in which Gertrude Bell lived as a child, and the Bell Brothers office building in Middlesbrough (his only commercial development; later to be the Dorman Long offices). An additional commission in the Cleveland area was Briarmead, completed in 1883, located north of Greatham village, near Hartlepool. The adjoining St Francis Cottage was completed by W.F. Linton (Middlesbrough) in 1895 in the style of Webb.

In 1901 Philip Webb retired to the country and ceased practising. He continued to be an influence on the "school of rational builders" surrounding William Lethaby, and Ernest Gimson and his community of architect-craftsmen based at Sapperton in Gloucestershire. Between 1902 and 1903, Webb contributed to the design and manufacture of the University of Birmingham's ceremonial mace.

Projects

Red House, Bexleyheath, (1859)
Sandroyd, now Benfleet Hall, Cobham, Surrey (1860)
Cranmer Hall wing, Fakenham (c.1860) and Coach House (1860)
91-101 Worship St, London EC2 (1862)
Arisaig House, Highland (1863, rebuilt 1937)
All Saints' and St Richard's Church of England Primary School, Old Heathfield, East Sussex, (Formerly Heathfield Church of England Primary School) (1864) 
1 Palace Green, London (1868)
Red Barns House, Redcar (1868)
19 Lincoln's Inn Fields, London (1868)
The West House, 35 Glebe Place, Chelsea, London (1868–69) for George Price Boyce
Joldwynds, Holmbury St Mary, Surrey (1874) Demolished 1930 and replaced with a Modernist house by Oliver Hill. Some ancillary buildings by Webb remain and are listed.
Smeaton Manor, Yorkshire (1878)
Four Gables, Green Lane House, Brampton, Cumbria
St Martin's Church, Brampton (1878)
Conyhurst, Surrey for Mary Ewart (1885)
Clouds House, Wiltshire (1886)
Naworth Castle, Cumbria
Standen, West Sussex (1892–94)
Bell & Co Ltd (offices), Zetland Rd, Middlesbrough (1891)
Rounton Grange, near Middlesbrough (for Sir Isaac Lowthian Bell) – subsequently destroyed
Forthampton Court, Forthampton, Gloucestershire (1889–92)
Berkeley Castle, Gloucestershire (1874–77)

Notes

Further reading 
Lethaby, W.R. (1935/1979).Philip Webb and His Work. Oxford University Press 1935. Reprinted Raven Oak Press 1979. 
Kirk, Sheila (2005).Philip Webb: Pioneer of the Arts and Crafts Movement. Wiley-Academy 
Miele, Chris(Ed)(2005).From William Morris: Building Conservation and the Arts and Crafts Cult of Authenticity 1877-1939. Yale University Press. 
Aplin, John (2016). The Letters of Philip Webb 4 vols, Routledge 2016.

External links

1831 births
1915 deaths
19th-century English architects
Architects from Oxford
Arts and Crafts architects
Arts and Crafts movement artists
Morris & Co.
Socialist League (UK, 1885) members